Khalij (The Gulf) or Khalij-e Fars ( Persian Gulf), is a studio album by Iranian singer, Ebi, released in 1990 on the label of Taraneh Records.

Track listing

References

1990 albums
Ebi albums